KaMichael Charles Hall (born January 22, 1985) is a Canadian football linebacker who is a free agent. He was signed by the Indianapolis Colts as an undrafted free agent in 2008. He played college football at Georgia Tech.

Hall was also a member of the Montreal Alouettes.

References

External links
Georgia Tech Yellow Jackets bio
Indianapolis Colts bio
Montreal Alouettes bio

1985 births
Living people
People from Houston
American football linebackers
American players of Canadian football
Canadian football linebackers
Georgia Tech Yellow Jackets football players
Indianapolis Colts players
Montreal Alouettes players
Rio Grande Valley Sol players